Kriminálka Anděl is a Czech crime drama television series which premiered on TV Nova in 2008.  This TV series is a remake of the Slovak crime series Mesto tieňov.

Plot 
A police department in Prague, Czech Republic solves crimes of passion and premeditated murders.

Production 
First season was shot as a co-production between Czech channel TV Nova and Slovak channel TV Markíza. Since the second season, the series was shot by TV Nova only, without Slovak co-production.

Cast and characters 
 Martin Stropnický as major Ivan Tomeček
 David Švehlík as captain Tomáš Benkovský
 Marek Taclík as captain Oliver Hajn
 Michal Novotný as technical writer Rudolf Uhlíř
 Helena Dvořáková as psychologist Jana Chládková
 Ladislav Frej as pathologist Karel Benkovský
 Miloslav Mejzlík as colonel Milan Horák
 Ivana Chýlková as lieutenant colonel Dagmar Kopecká (since season 3)
 Ladislav Hrušovský as Sergej Kopriva
 Zlata Adamovská as colonel Věra Beránková (since season 4)
 Jana Pidrmanová as Lída Rysová (since season 4)

List of episodes

References

External links 
 Official page
 

Czech crime television series
TV Nova (Czech TV channel) original programming
2008 Czech television series debuts
Czech television series based on non-Czech television series